Happy Endings is an original novel written by Paul Cornell and based on the long-running British science fiction television series Doctor Who. It is the fiftieth book in the Virgin New Adventures series. It features the Seventh Doctor, Bernice, Chris, Roz, Jason, Ace, the Brigadier, Romana II, Kadiatu and Irving Braxiatel, as well as characters from almost every previous New Adventures novel. It centres on the wedding of Bernice and Jason.

As part of the celebratory nature of the book, being the fiftieth of the New Adventures novels, one chapter contains contributions from the authors of all the previous books in the series (except Jim Mortimore). The section by author Neil Penswick features Death in a brief cameo, quoting her dialogue from the original The Books of Magic mini-series written by Neil Gaiman.

Plot

A wedding is meant to be held between Mr Jason Kane and Professor Bernice S. Summerfield in 2010. However chaos erupts as Time Lord associates show up from all over. And someone seems to want to prevent the entire event in the first place.

References

External links

Wedding Notes: An Annotated Guide to Happy Endings, by Paul Scoones (Time Space Visualiser issue 49, November 1996)

1996 British novels
1996 science fiction novels
Virgin New Adventures
Novels by Paul Cornell
Happy
Seventh Doctor novels
Fiction set in 2010